Dustin "Dusty" Watson is an American drummer who has played in a number of  notable bands, as well as backed up famous solo artists.

Earning a scholarship to Stan Kenton Band Clinics and joining the Musicians Union at age 17 allowed Dusty to become a professional drummer at a young age. He formed local California punk band The Press and by the end of the 1970s he was also an original member of Jon and the Nightriders and The Stepmothers. After leaving The Runaways, Lita Ford asked Dusty to join her original line up and he recorded her debut album, Out for Blood, and toured with her from 1980 through 1984. After that he joined the band Legs Diamond, whom he would play with until 1993. During this period, Dusty did side work in a number of bands, including Concrete Blonde, Channel 3, Laureen Ellis, The Boss Martians and talk show host Wally George.

After leaving Legs Diamond, he played drums on hip hop group Boo-Yaa T.R.I.B.E.'s albums Metally Disturbed and Angry Samoans and toured Europe with them. He went on to join Sugartooth, but the band quickly broke up after they were dropped by Geffen Records. Shortly after this he started instrumental surf band Slacktone with co-founder Dave Wronski and started touring with Agent Orange (whom he would continue to work with through 2009). In 1997, he joined Dick Dale's backing band The Del-Tones, recording and touring with them through 2006.
Through the years Dusty has also recorded together with Canadian born rocker Neil Merryweather, with whom he played in the  Lita Ford band.

In 2004 he joined The Queers to play on their albums Acid Beaters and Summer Hits No. 1. 
 
Recently, he has drummed with the Supersuckers and Rhino Bucket.

He also joined the psychedelic punk rock/thrash metal, BLOODHOOK, recording their debut full-length album at the legendary Van Nuys, California recording studio, Sound City.

In March 2009, Watson married Colorado-native and female drummer Rikki Styxx who moved to California following. In 2010, he joined The Balboas, subsequently releasing the albums Big As You Need in 2012 and Submit to the Blade in 2019.

Watson has also played with Rhino Bucket, the Queers, Becky Barksdale, Davie Allan and the Arrows, Slacktone, the Surfaris, The Balboas, The Sonics, and The Bellrays.
Dusty is currently playing drums in Nashville Pussy.

References

External links

American punk rock drummers
American male drummers
American rock drummers
Living people
Musicians from California
The Queers members
Year of birth missing (living people)